Gaurav Solanki  (born 7 July, 1986) is an Indian fiction writer, poet, screenwriter and lyricist. He has written songs for Ugly, Daas Dev and Veere Di Wedding. In 2012, he was awarded Jnanpeeth's Navlekhan Puraskar which he refused to accept. He has written much acclaimed film Article 15.

Early life and education 
Gaurav Solanki was born in Meerut (U.P.) and grew up in Sangaria (Rajasthan). He graduated from IIT Roorkee.

Career 
His first break in films was Anurag Kashyap's Ugly (2014) for which he wrote lyrics. Kashyap also bought the rights to his story "Hisar mein Hahakar". Solanki wrote songs for Daas Dev (2018) and Veere Di Wedding (2018). His screenplay Nisaar was selected for Drishyam Films Sundance Institute Screenwriters Lab, 2016. In 2019, he wrote the film Article 15. He also wrote the web series Tandav  in 2021.

Books 
Solanki's first short-story collection, Gyrahvin-A ke Ladke, was released at the Jaipur Literature Festival in 2018. It was among the top three Hindi books in the Dainik Jagran Nielsen Bookscan bestseller list in its first quarter.

Filmography

Film

Television

References 

1986 births
Living people
21st-century Indian writers
People from Meerut district
IIT Roorkee alumni